Hornstra is a surname. Notable people with the surname include:

Inge Hornstra (born 1974), Dutch-born Australian actress
Rob Hornstra (born 1975), Dutch photographer